(I have given over to God's heart and mind), 92, is a cantata by Johann Sebastian Bach for use in the Lutheran service. He composed the chorale cantata in Leipzig for Septuagesimae and first performed it on 28 January 1725. It is based on the hymn "" by Paul Gerhardt (1647), and is the only chorale cantata Bach based on a hymn by Gerhardt.

History and words 
When Bach composed the cantata, he was in his second year as Thomaskantor (director of church music) in Leipzig. During his first year, beginning with the first Sunday after Trinity 1723, he had written a cycle of cantatas for the occasions of the liturgical year. In his second year he composed a second annual cycle of cantatas, which was planned to consist exclusively of chorale cantatas, each based on one Lutheran hymn. It included .

Bach composed the cantata for Septuagesima, the third Sunday before Lent. The prescribed readings for the Sunday were taken from the First Epistle to the Corinthians, "race for victory", and from the Gospel of Matthew, the parable of the Workers in the Vineyard. That year, Bach composed a cycle of chorale cantatas, begun on the first Sunday after Trinity of 1724. The cantata is based on "", a hymn in twelve stanzas by Paul Gerhardt (1647), sung to the melody of 
"". The theme of the hymn is faith in God and the submission to his will. An unknown poet kept five stanzas unchanged, in contrast to the usual two for opening and closing a chorale cantata. He retained the first stanza for the first movement, the second for the second movement, the fifth stanza for the fourth movement, the tenth stanza for the seventh movement, and the twelfth stanza for the ninth and final movement. He paraphrased ideas from the fourth stanza in the third movement, an aria, used phrases from stanzas 6 and 8 in the fifth movement, a recitative, ideas from the ninth stanza in the sixth movement, and elements from the eleventh stanza in the eighth movement. He interpolated recitative in the chorale in movements 2 and 7, but without reference to the gospel.

Bach first performed the cantata on 28 January 1725. Bach's manuscript of the score and the parts of that performance are extant.

Scoring and structure 
The cantata is scored for four vocal soloists—soprano, alto, tenor and bass—a four-part choir (SATB), two oboes d'amore, two violins, viola, and basso continuo. The cantata is in nine movements and is one of Bach's longer cantatas both in terms of form and amount of text and music, lasting around thirty minutes.

 Chorus: 
 Recitative (bass) and chorale: 
 Aria (tenor): 
 Chorale: 
 Recitative (tenor): 
 Aria (bass): 
 Chorale (choir) and recitative (bass, tenor, alto, soprano): 
 Aria (soprano): 
 Chorale:

Music 
Klaus Hofmann notes that the choice of chorale is surprising because it has the same tune as the base for the cantata of the previous week, . The melody appears in an interesting combination of phrases of different length, two measures alternating with three measures. The vocal parts are embedded in an independent orchestral concerto. their motifs are not taken from the hymn tune, but from the orchestra. The musicologist Julian Mincham notes the movement's "shimmering, translucent beauty, apparent from the very beginning".

Bach successfully tried to shape the five movements, which cite the chorale in words and music, differently. In the bass recitative, the singer switches between rendering the chorale tune and free recitative, with elements of tone painting. For example, "" (with cracking and terrible crashing, the mountains and the hills must fall) is depicted with "very fast downward sequences into the depths – very similar to the depiction of the veil of the temple being torn asunder when Jesus dies" in the St John Passion and the St Matthew Passion. The tenor aria illustrates a dramatic text, "" (See, see, how [it] is torn, how it breaks and falls) in the "truly bizarre contour of the vocal line" and in "rhythmically disjointed orchestral writing". The next chorale stanza is sung by the alto to an independent trio of the oboes and the continuo, with the word "" (sad) rendered by chromatic lines in the oboes. The message is God's wisdom, "" (He knows the time, the place, the hour in which to act or not to act).

The bass aria describes the "howling and raging of the rough winds", an image of the rough situation of a Christian, by "incessant movement" of both the voice and the continuo. In the following chorale, the text again is alternating chorale words and free poetry. This time Bach alternates also the voices, the chorale is sung by the choir, the recitative by the four soloists in the sequence bass, tenor, alto and soprano. The last line, "" (And, with muted strings, I can prepare a new song for the Prince of Peace) leads to the following soprano aria, which Bach graces with pizzicato of the strings and no continuo, to which oboe d'amore and soprano perform a "graceful, dance-like melody and poignant ascending sixths and sevenths". John Eliot Gardiner notes that in the "enchanting conclusion" on the words "" (Amen: Father take me up!), "innocence, trust and fragility are all rolled into one". The cantata is closed by a four-part setting of the chorale.

The cantata is Bach's only chorale cantata based on a hymn by Gerhardt.

Recordings 
 Bach Made in Germany Vol. 1 – Cantatas III, Günther Ramin, Thomanerchor, Gewandhausorchester, Erika Burkhardt, Gerda Schriever, Gert Lutze, Hans Hauptmann, Eterna 1954
 Les Grandes Cantates de J. S. Bach Vol. 17, Fritz Werner, Heinrich-Schütz-Chor Heilbronn, Württembergisches Kammerorchester Heilbronn, Emiko Iiyama, Barbara Scherler, Theo Altmeyer, Bruce Abel, Erato 1972
 Bach Cantatas Vol. 2 – Easter’, Karl Richter, Münchener Bach-Chor, Münchener Bach-Orchester, Edith Mathis, Peter Schreier, Dietrich Fischer-Dieskau, Archiv Produktion 1974
 J. S. Bach: Das Kantatenwerk · Complete Cantatas · Les Cantates, Folge / Vol. 23 – BWV 91-94, Gustav Leonhardt, Knabenchor Hannover, Collegium Vocale Gent, Leonhardt-Consort, soloist of the Knabenchor Hannover, Paul Esswood, Kurt Equiluz, Max van Egmond, Telefunken 1978
 Die Bach Kantate Vol. 26, Helmuth Rilling, Gächinger Kantorei, Bach-Collegium Stuttgart, Arleen Augér, Gabriele Schreckenbach, Aldo Baldin, Philippe Huttenlocher, Hänssler 1980
 Bach Edition Vol. 5 – Cantatas Vol. 2, Pieter Jan Leusink, Holland Boys Choir, Netherlands Bach Collegium, Ruth Holton, Sytse Buwalda, Knut Schoch, Bas Ramselaar, Brilliant Classics 1999
 Bach Cantatas Vol. 20: Naarden / Southwell / For Septuagesima, John Eliot Gardiner, Monteverdi Choir, English Baroque Soloists, Miah Persson, Wilke te Brummelstroete, James Oxley, Jonathan Brown, Soli Deo Gloria 2000
 J. S. Bach: Complete Cantatas Vol. 13, Ton Koopman, Amsterdam Baroque Orchestra & Choir, Deborah York, Franziska Gottwald, Paul Agnew, Klaus Mertens, Antoine Marchand 2000
 J. S. Bach: Cantatas Vol. 33 – BWV 41, 92, 130, Masaaki Suzuki, Bach Collegium Japan, Yukari Nonoshita, Robin Blaze, Jan Kobow, Dominik Wörner, BIS 2005

References

Sources 
 
 Ich hab in Gottes Herz und Sinn BWV 92; BC A 42 / Chorale cantata (Septuagesima) Bach Digital
 Cantata BWV 92 Ich hab in Gottes Herz und Sinn: history, scoring, sources for text and music, translations to various languages, discography, discussion, Bach Cantatas Website
 BWV 92 Ich hab in Gottes Herz und Sinn: English translation, University of Vermont
 BWV 92 Ich hab in Gottes Herz und Sinn: text, scoring, University of Alberta
 Luke Dahn: BWV 92.9 bach-chorales.com

Church cantatas by Johann Sebastian Bach
1725 compositions
Chorale cantatas